Malcolm Deas is an English historian specializing in the study of Latin America in general and Colombia in particular. He studied modern history at New College, Oxford, and went on to become a Fellow of All Souls College and St Antony's College. He taught at Oxford University for nearly five decades until his retirement in 2008. He was one of the key figures at the Latin American Centre in Oxford, founded by Sir Raymond Carr in the 1960s.

Deas is regarded as a pioneer of Colombian historiography, not just in the Global North but even in Colombia itself. He has published extensively on the history of the country, both in scholarly journals and in popular publications such as The New Statesman, The Listener, The Spectator, The London Review of Books and The Times. In the early 1990s, he served as an advisor to President César Gaviria; his work there earned him the Cruz de Boyacá from Colombia, and an OBE from the British government. He is also a member of the Orden Andrés Bello (Venezuela) and the Orden de Mérito (Ecuador), and has an Honorary Doctorate from the Universidad de los Andes, Bogotá. In 2008, he was made a citizen of Colombia. On that occasion, the Colombian economist Santiago Montenegro Trujillo called Deas an "illustrious Colombian".

References

English historians
Fellows of St Antony's College, Oxford
Historians of Colombia
Living people
Year of birth missing (living people)